VitaliV (or Vitali V, real name Vitali Vinogradov) is a contemporary British artist, sharing his time between the UK and Italy studios. He creates abstract art inspired by patterns in microchips. He initially referred to his artistic style based on  microchips computer design as "digital art" but the term seemed too generic, and the artist soon decided in favour of  "schematism" (like "vorticism" or "suprematism") – the term he invented himself to represent his signature style.  Some of his works have been laser-cut in relief and then hand-painted as 3D objects.

Biography
Vitali was born in Odessa (in Ukraine, U.S.S.R.) in 1957. He studied engineering and classical painting. VitaliV received his first degree (engineering) from the Odessa Maritime College. Thereafter,  he was deployed to different locations in the Russian Arctic and Siberia for 6 years.

In 1979 Vitali moved to St. Petersburg (then Leningrad) and in 1983 he enrolled at the St. Petersburg Academy of Arts, first, as a part-time and subsequently, as a full-time student in the sculpture department.

In 1989 he won a scholarship at the Norwich University College of the Arts in the UK as an exchange student. In 1989 he lived in the legendary St. Petersburg  underground art squat Мансарды  "Аптека Пеля". From 1991 onwards Vitali has resided in London. He currently commutes between his London and Italian studios.
In his earlier years in the UK he supported himself by organising a photocopiers retail business with Russia.  He later founded the TV3  network.

In 1993 Vitali established an Art Community which became known as "Bank", as it was based in the former Barclays Bank building in Hoxton. It was a pioneering multimedia arts centre where he held series of OMSK short film festivals, organised conceptual art exhibitions, sculpture shows (including monumental sculptures),  video installations and displayed works produced in new, digital, media formats.

Art
Vitali moved to the UK in 1989.  On completing his degree at the Norwich University College of the Arts and after a number of successful painting and sculpture shows, he led a community of artists and film connoisseurs in Hoxton and other parts of London. While living in London and studying contemporary art, VitaliV also found and developed his signature style, known as "schematism".  The essence of his style are simple geometrical patterns—circles and lines connected at 45° angles.
According to the artist, "in the mid-1990s I was living and working in London. These were the years before the Internet took over. I was thinking about how exciting it would be to create a cyberspace museum, both as an artist and as a businessman. If I didn’t do it, someone else might,  and then I would miss this chance of a lifetime!" While still thinking on it, I opened up a computer and became suddenly fascinated with its motherboard. I immediately loved the look of it: it was complicated and fantastical with a green or red base and lots of golden lines. It was a piece of art in its own right; I like the aesthetics and the logic, so I thought about starting to make art based on this". In 1993 VitaliV established his Cyberspace museum on BBS, Bank, Hoxton, in London. 
Since 2007 Vitali has been sharing  his time between his UK and Italian studios. He confesses: 
"I have always dreamt of living as artist in Italy. Italy gives a lot to an artist: culture, history, nature. I can’t think of another country that would give me so much".
In 2008 VitaliV ran a joint project Digital Butterfly with artist Pino Signoretto in Murano, Venice. 
 
Eventually, Vitali ventured into design and decorative arts, applying the principles of "schematism" in various fields and experimenting 
with tableware, porcelain, designer fashion clothes, accessories and furniture, as well as jewellery. Among his recent projects is the Jewellery collection for ZBird (China). He also released his fashion collections and launched them during French Fashion week in 2008 (Zone, the Louvre, Paris, France) and London Fashion Week in 2009.
According to ArtRabbit, "his practice is both eccentric and technologically innovative, consisting of a range of lightboxes, CNC laser-cut reliefs, aluminium and acrylic resins and a 3D film".

Gallery

Exhibitions 
Select Exhibitions, Shows and Projects include:
2021. "A premonition of the Future" Russian State Museum, Saint Petersburg
2019. Art Show in Old Brompton Gallery.
2018 "Digital Porcelain Collections". Old Brompton Gallery.
2014-2015 Jewellery collections for ZBird (China)
 2013 The Dinner is served", The State Russian Museum, Saint-Petersburg.
 2011 The Fourth Moscow Biennale of contemporary art, Fabrica, Moscow.
 2011 VideoAkt, International Biennale, Barcelona.
 2011 Infame, Forman's Smokehouse gallery, London.
 2010 Digital life, Salon Gallery, London.
 2009 Moda, Picture, Style, State Russian Museum, Saint-Petersburg.
 2008 Digital Butterfly by Pino Signoretto, project. Murano, Venice.
 2007 Digital metamorphosis, Summer Gardens, State Russian Museum, Saint-Petersburg.
 2006 Digital art, Sands, Las-Vegas.
 2000 Cook-art, Islington Design Centre, London.
 1999 S.Rossine & VitalyV, New Burlington gallery, London.
 1999 Three tons of food, Bank, London.
 1999 Temporary radio, Radio Suisse, Geneva.
 1996 Africa, Kostroma, VitalyV, SEM, Saint-Petersburg.
 1995 Three artists, Albemarle Gallery, London.
 1995 Fragments, Merts Contemporary Gallery, London.
 1994 A4 gallery, Flash art magazine, London.
 1994 Real size of Fuji, Flash art magazine, London.

 References 

 Sources
 Budd, M., & Crowther, P. (2008). Aesthetic essence, The aesthetic: from experience to art. In R. Shusterman, & A. Tomlin (Eds.), Aesthetic Experience'' (pp. 17–45). New York: Routledge.
Leonida, G. (1981). Handbook of Printed Circuit Design, Manufacture, Components & Assembly. Essex: Electrochemical Publications Ltd.
 Negroponte, N. (1995). Being Digital. New York: Knopf.

 I. Karasik. Vitaly Vinogradov, NOMI 4,4/63/2008 Saint Petersburg. .
 T. Suvorova. Brave new world, Hermitage, summer 2008.
 T. Shvetskaya, Numeric Harmony, Hermitage, summer 2008.
 A. Halfin, 7th-line, Iskusstvo Rossia, 2000 .
 "Real size of Fuji", Flash art international, 1994.
 "VitaliV Chips", Artselector.com.
 Article 19427, fashionandrunway.com.
 "VitaliV Digital Life", Artrabbit.com.
  "BlazBlue Art - VitaliV", Guardian.co.uk.
 "Chips by Vitali V", Artreview.com.
  "Chips by Vitali V", saatchi-gallery.co.uk.

External links 

 
 Projects - 4th Moscow Biennale, The Outer Space State of Transcendental Turnover
 readoz.com

1957 births
Living people
20th-century Russian painters
20th-century sculptors
21st-century Russian painters
21st-century sculptors
British ceramicists
British contemporary artists
British digital artists
British fashion designers
Russian contemporary artists
Russian male painters
Ukrainian emigrants to the United Kingdom
20th-century Russian male artists
21st-century Russian male artists
British people of Russian-Jewish descent